The 2005 Four Continents Figure Skating Championships was an international figure skating competition in the 2004–05 season. It was held at the Gangneung Ice Centre in Gangneung, South Korea on February 14–20. Medals were awarded in the disciplines of men's singles, ladies' singles, pair skating, and ice dancing. The compulsory dance was the Golden Waltz.

Medals table

Results

Men

Ladies

Pairs

Ice dancing

External links
 

Four Continents Figure Skating Championships, 2005
Four Continents Figure Skating Championships
Four Continents
Sports competitions in Gangneung
International figure skating competitions hosted by South Korea